Anolaima is a municipality and township of Colombia in the department of Cundinamarca. It is located in the providence of Tequendama at  West from Bogotá in between the cities of Facatativá and La Mesa.

Anolaima is known as the Fruit Capital of Colombia, its temperate climate allows an ongoing growth of all kind of fruits that are harvested from the coldest to the warmest temperatures in Colombia.

Brief history

Anolaima was first discovered by a European in 1538 - Gonzalo Jiménez de Quesada. The "Anolaymas" were the Indian native of the Panche Tribe. They were one of the first tribes found by the Spaniards that descended from the region of Zipacón and Bogotá savanna.  Conqueror Gonzalo Jiménez de Quezada, who led the expedition, was defeated in 1538 at the Battle of Tocarema.

Tourism 
The celebration of Corpus Christi (Latin for "Body of Christ") and the Peasant's Day is conducted every year around the first holiday weekend of June. Normally, it is held the first Thursday after Trinity Sunday. Its celebration on a Thursday is meant to associate it with institution by Jesus of the Eucharist during the Last Supper. In Anolaima this celebration commences usually on Friday ending it the following Monday honoring the peasants and/or farmers of the region with food, prices and trophies.
All the farmers collect the best fruits and vegetables from their farms to build huge designs or sculptures shape like animals or people-like figures made of fruits, seeds, vegetables and even life animals. The best sculpture or arch wins the best trophy that is given to the farmers the last day during "El Dia del campesino" (Peasant's day).

Every day and all day during the Corpus there are many music bands, dance groups and the best orchestra bands of salsa, merengue and vallenato of Colombia. On Sunday morning,  there is a  huge "procession" where all schools with their marching bands, military bands and the celebration of the Eucharist is held at the main square.

The Corpus in Anolaima was held on June 12, 13, 14 of 2010.

Born in Anolaima 
 Julio Ernesto Bernal, former professional cyclist
 Daniel Camargo Barbosa, serial killer

References

Municipalities of Cundinamarca Department